Elections to Three Rivers District Council were held on 5 May 2011 to elect one-third of the council of Three Rivers district in England. These seats had been previously defended in 2007.

The Liberal Democrats (Lib Dems) won the largest number of seats and, marginally, the most votes. The Conservatives failed to strengthen their position against the Liberal Democrats, gaining one seat from the Lib Dems but losing another to Labour. Overall, however, this council remains under firm Lib Dem control, with most seats contested between them and the Conservatives, and Labour having little prospect of improving their own representation, beyond their core wards.

A senior Labour Party councillor, elected in 2007, defected to the Lib Dems shortly before this election.

After the election, the composition of the council was:
 Liberal Democrat 29 (-1)
 Conservative 14 (no change)
 Labour 4 (+1)
 English Democrats Party 1

Election result
Changes relate to movement between elections and do not reflect interim defections.

Ward results
Defending incumbent marked with "*"

References

2011
2011 English local elections
2010s in Hertfordshire